Mohammad Ali Khan Mohmand(19 January 1958 to 2 November 2012) was a Pakistani politician.  He was a member of the Provincial Assembly of Khyber Pakhtunkhwa elected from Shabqadar,  and also remained as the first Chairman of district council Charsadda. He suffered grave injuries in a suicide blast on 3 March 2012 and after eight months of protracted illness, he died on 2 November 2012. 

He is the elder son of Tribal Elder of Mohmand Agency Federally Administered Tribal Areas; former MPA and Senator Haji Dilawar Khan Mohmand & son-in-law of a retired Commissioner Haji Hidayatullah Khan Mohmand. One of his brothers, Qurban Ali Khan is a Customs officer.

In by-elections his elder son Babar Ali Khan Mohmand was elected MPA.

References 
https://web.archive.org/web/20120227162801/http://www.senate.gov.pk/ShowMemberDetail.asp?MemberCode=337&CatCode=0&CatName=
http://hr.cbr.gov.pk/IRSInvalidOptionReceived.aspx

2012 deaths
Pashtun people
People from Mohmand District
1958 births
Members of the Provincial Assembly of Khyber Pakhtunkhwa
People from Charsadda District, Pakistan